The 1946 Florida N&I Lions football team, sometimes also referred to as Florida Normal, was an American football team that represented Florida Normal and Industrial Memorial College (now known as Florida Memorial University) in the Southeastern Athletic Conference (SEAC) during the 1946 college football season. The team's appearance in the Flower Bowl was the first time a Florida team played in a New Year's Day game.

Florida Normal's Joe Carter led the nation in scoring with 152 points on 21 touchdowns and 25 extra points. 

Two Florida Normal players were named to the 1946 All-Southeast Conference football team: Carter at quarterback and Danly Smith at tackle.

Schedule

References

Florida NandI
Florida NandI football